Agam Singh Giri (27 December 1927 – 31 January 1971) was an Indian Nepali poet and lyricist from Darjeeling, India.

References

1927 births
1971 deaths
People from Darjeeling district
Nepali-language poets
Nepali-language poets from India
Recipients of the Sahitya Akademi Award in Nepali
Indian Gorkhas
Indian poets
Khas people